Lake Township is the name of some places in the U.S. state of Minnesota:
Lake Township, Roseau County, Minnesota
Lake Township, Wabasha County, Minnesota

See also 
Lake Township (disambiguation)

Minnesota township disambiguation pages